Svay Rieng may refer to:

Svay Rieng (town), Cambodia
Svay Rieng Province, Cambodia

See also
Preah Khan Reach Svay Rieng FC, a Cambodian association football club